Not So Pretty is an American documentary television miniseries directed by Kirby Dick and Amy Ziering that explores the beauty industry and hidden chemicals in products. It consists of 4-episodes and premiered on April 14, 2022, on HBO Max.

Premise
An investigative look into the beauty industry, looking into hidden chemicals in products.

Episodes

Production
In September 2020, it was announced Kirby Dick and Amy Ziering would direct and executive produce a documentary-series revolving around the beauty industry, with Entertainment One set to produce, for HBO Max. In April 2022, it was announced Keke Palmer would serve as narrator.

Reception
Angie Han of The Hollywood Reporter gave the series a positive review writing: "It’s valuable as the start of a larger conversation to be had about the hidden dangers of the beauty industry, for consumers and viewers alike." Joel Keller of Decider also gave the series a positive review writing: "Not So Pretty presents some pretty harrowing information in a tone that’s less hectoring and more sympathetic. By playing the, “hey, we didn’t know, either, buddy” card, its message is even more effective." Conversely, Kyndall Cunningham of The Daily Beast gave the series a negative review writing: "What you’re supposed to take away from the series as a consumer can be confusing and overwhelming at times."

References

External links
 

2020s American television miniseries
2022 American television series debuts
2022 American television series endings
HBO Max original programming